Anomala wutaiensis is a species of beetle in the family Scarabaeidae. It was described by Ming-Zhi Zhao and Carsten Zorn in 2022.

Etymology 
The species is named after Wutai County, where the type was collected.

Distribution 
This species can be found in Taiwan.

References 

Rutelinae
Beetles described in 2022